Francis Barton Gummere (March 6, 1855, Burlington, New Jersey – May 30, 1919, Haverford, Pennsylvania) was a Professor of English, an influential scholar of folklore and ancient languages, and a student of Francis James Child.

Early life
Gummere was a descendant of an old German-American Quaker family; his grandfather John Gummere (1784-1845) was one of the founders of the Haverford School, which became Haverford College, of which Gummere's father Samuel James Gummere (1811-1874) was the first president. Gummere's father became the president of the college in 1862, when Gummere was 7, and Gummere graduated from Haverford at the age of 17. After working for several years, he returned to study and received an A.B. from Harvard University and an A.M. from Haverford in 1875. From 1875 to 1881 he taught at the Moses Brown School in Providence, Rhode Island, where his father had taught some years previously. During these years he took trips to Europe to pursue further studies, ultimately earning a PhD magna cum laude at Freiburg in 1881.

Later academic career
After a year teaching English at Harvard, Gummere spent five years as the headmaster of the Swain Free School in New Bedford, Massachusetts. In 1887 he became an English professor at Haverford, a position he held until his death on May 30, 1919. Gummere served as president of the Modern Language Association in 1905.

Child ballads 
Both Francis James Child and his successor Kittredge gathered about themselves a group of students to assist in and continue the study of the ballads. While a student at Harvard, Gummere assisted Child in their compilation. He later wrote two books which were based upon this collaboration. 

His first was Old English Ballads, which he dedicated to Child as "the teacher who has taught a host of pupils to welcome honest work in whatever degree of excellence, and of the friend who never failed to help and encourage the humblest of his fellows." In the Preface, Gummere acknowledged Child's review of the publisher's proof sheets for his book's Glossary, and acknowledged George Lyman Kittredge's review of the proof sheets of the Introduction, Glossary, and Notes. Gummere's selection was intended as a representative sampling from the Child ballads. It was in this book that Gummere introduced his concept of the communal composition of ballads as primitive "poetry which once came from the people as a whole, from the compact body as yet undivided by lettered or unlettered taste, and represents the sentiment neither of individuals nor of a class."

In his second book, The Popular Ballad, Gummere described in detail his proposal for ballad evolution, which was based upon changes in structure and form. The classification ranges from the primitive to the epic:
ballads which are structured as a series of progressive refrains
the simplest structure
ballads which are structured as a dominant chorus, but with a simple subordinate narrative
the transition between situations is abrupt, which Gummere called "leaping and lingering"
longer ballads which are completely narrative
what Gummere called "chronicle ballads" (now known as the Border ballads), and the "greenwood ballads" (now known as the Robin Hood ballads)
combination of narrative ballads as a "coherent epic poem"
Gummere placed a single ballad in this category: A Gest of Robyn Hode (Child 117)

Two other students of Kittredge's expanded Gummere's classification:
 Walter Morris Hart later wrote Ballad and Epic. A Study in the Development of the Narrative Art.
 William Hall Clawson wrote his doctoral thesis on the Robin Hood ballads, which was later published as The Gest of Robin Hood. Prior to the publication of his thesis, Clawson wrote a summary article for The Journal of American Folklore. In this article, Clawson combined the ballad classification work done by Gummere and Hart.

Beowulf translation
Gummere was also a translator; his Beowulf was published in 1910 as part of the Harvard Classics series. In 1991 John Espey wrote of Gummere's Beowulf, "it remains the most successful attempt to render in modern English something similar to the alliterative pattern of the original", in a review of an audiobook version of Gummere's Beowulf by George Guidall. A graphic novel version of Beowulf by Gareth Hinds published in the 2000s uses Gummere's translation.

In memoriam
One of Gummere's students was writer Christopher Morley, whose memoriam on Gummere was part of his 1922 essay collection Plum Pudding.

Family
Gummere married Amelia Smith Mott (1859-1937) in 1882; she was a noted scholar of Quaker history. Their son Richard Mott Gummere was a professor of Latin and headmaster of the William Penn Charter School. Their second son Samuel James Gummere had a military career, reaching the rank of major. A third son, Francis Barton Gummere Jr., was an invalid.

Works
The Anglo-Saxon Metaphor, 1881
A Handbook of Poetics, 1885
Germanic Origins: A study in primitive culture, 1892. Republished in 1930 as Founders of England with notes by Francis Peabody Magoun.
Old English Ballads, 1894
The Beginnings of Poetry, 1901
The Popular Ballad, 1907
The Oldest English Epic, 1909
The Democracy of Poetry, 1911

References

External links
 
 

People from Burlington, New Jersey
University of Freiburg alumni
Haverford College faculty
American folklorists
Translators from Old English
Fellows of the American Academy of Arts and Sciences
Harvard University alumni
1855 births
1919 deaths
19th-century translators
Haverford College alumni
Presidents of the Modern Language Association